Osmanpur Union is a union parishad of Khoksa Upazila, in Kushtia District, Khulna Division of Bangladesh. There are 11 villages and 11 mouzas in the union.

References

External links
 

Unions of Khulna Division
Unions of Khoksa Upazila
Unions of Kushtia District